The Battle of St. Quentin was a battle of the Franco-Prussian War in which Prussian forces defeated French attempts to relieve the besieged city of Paris.

While the Prussian armies under Wilhelm I besieged Paris, the Prussian I Army, now under the command of August Karl von Goeben was sent to deal with French forces north of Paris. After a first attempt to relieve Paris had been checked at the battle of Bapaume, the French were planning another relief effort.

Von Goeben marched his army north and met the irregular French army under General Louis Faidherbe near Saint-Quentin. On 19 January the Prussians attacked and decisively defeated the French forces. The same day General Trochu attempted a breakout of Paris but it too was defeated. No other significant attempts would be made to lift the siege of Paris.

Sources
 Compton's Home Library: Battles of the World
  History of the Franco Prussian War

Battles of the Franco-Prussian War
1871 in France
Battles involving France
Battles involving Prussia
St Quentin 1871
History of Aisne
January 1871 events